The Homestake Mine was a deep underground gold mine (8,000 feet or 2,438 m) located in Lead, South Dakota. Until it closed in 2002 it was the largest and deepest gold mine in North America.

The Homestake Mine is famous in scientific circles because of the work of a deep underground laboratory that was established there in the mid-1960s. This was the site where the solar neutrino problem was first discovered, in what is known as the Homestake Experiment. Raymond Davis Jr. conducted this experiment in the mid-1960s, which was the first to observe solar neutrinos.

On July 10, 2007, the mine was selected by the National Science Foundation as the location for the Deep Underground Science and Engineering Laboratory (DUSEL).  It won over several candidates, including the Henderson Mine near Empire, Colorado.

History

The Homestake deposit was discovered by Fred and Moses Manuel, Alex Engh, and Hank Harney in April 1876, during the Black Hills Gold Rush, when gold was discovered in the Black Hills, an area that had been guaranteed to the Lakota Nation by the Fort Laramie Treaty. A trio of mining entrepreneurs, George Hearst, Lloyd Tevis, and James Ben Ali Haggin, bought the claim from them for $70,000 in 1877.

George Hearst reached Deadwood in October 1877, and took control of the mine property. Hearst arranged to haul the mining equipment by wagon from the nearest railhead in Sidney, Nebraska. Arthur De Wint Foote worked as an engineer. Despite the remote location, deep mines were dug and ore began to be produced. An 80-stamp mill was built, and began crushing Homestake ore by July 1878.

In 1879 the partners sold shares in the Homestake Mining Company, and listed it on the New York Stock Exchange. The Homestake would become one of the longest-listed stocks in the history of the NYSE, as Homestake operated the mine until 2001.

Hearst consolidated and enlarged the Homestake property by fair and foul means. He bought out some adjacent claims, and secured others in the courts.  A Hearst employee killed a man who refused to sell his claim, but was acquitted in court after all the witnesses disappeared. Hearst purchased newspapers in Deadwood to influence public opinion. An opposing newspaper editor was physically attacked on a Deadwood street. Hearst realized that he might be on the receiving end of violence, and wrote a letter to his partners asking them to provide for his family should he be murdered. Within three years, Hearst had established the mine and acquired significant claims. He walked out alive, and very rich.

By the time Hearst left the Black Hills in March 1879, he had added the claims of Giant, Golden Star, Netty, May Booth, Golden Star No. 2, Crown Point, Sunrise, and General Ellison to the original two claims of the Manuel Brothers, Golden Terra and Old Abe, totaling .  The ten-stamp mill had become 200, and 500 employees worked in the mine, mills, offices and shops.  Hearst owned the Boulder Ditch and water rights to Whitewood Creek, monopolizing the region.  His railroad, Black Hills & Fort Pierre Railroad, gave him access to eastern Dakota Territory.  

In 1901, the mine started using compressed air locomotives, fully replacing mules and horses by the 1920s. Charles Washington Merrill introduced cyanidization to augment mercury-amalgamation for gold recovery. "Cyanide Charlie" achieved 94 per cent recovery. The gold was shipped to the Denver Mint.

By 1906, the Ellison Shaft reached , the B&M , the Golden Star , and the Golden Prospect , producing  of ore.  A disastrous fire struck on 25 March 1907, which took forty days to extinguish after the mine was flooded.  Another disastrous fire struck in 1919.

In 1927, company geologist Donald H. McLaughlin used a winze from the 2,000 level to demonstrate that ore reached the 3,500 foot level. The Yates shaft was started in 1938. Production ceased during WWII from 1943 until 1945, due to Limitation Order L-208 from the War Production Board.

The gold ore mined at Homestake was considered low grade (less than one ounce per ton), but the body of ore was large. In terms of total production, the Lead mining district, of which the Homestake mine is the only producer, was the second-largest gold producer in the United States, after the Carlin district in Nevada. Homestake was the longest continually operating mine in United States history.

The Homestake mine ceased production at the end of 2001.  Reasons included low gold prices, poor ore quality, and high costs.

Conversion to use for scientific research
The Barrick Gold corporation (which had merged with the Homestake Mining Company in mid-2001) agreed in early 2002 to keep dewatering the mine while owners were negotiating with the National Science Foundation over the mine as a potential site for a new deep underground laboratory (DUSEL). But progress was slow and maintaining the pumps and ventilation was costing $250,000 per month. The owners switched the equipment off on June 10, 2003 and closed the mine completely.

The Homestake Mine was selected in 2007 by NSF for the Deep Underground Science and Engineering Laboratory (DUSEL). In June 2009, researchers at University of California Berkeley announced that Homestake would be reopened for scientific research on neutrinos and dark matter particles using DUSEL and Large Underground Xenon experiment.

Research into enhanced geothermal systems is being prepared in the mine.

Geology

The gold at Homestake is almost exclusively confined to the Homestake Formation, an Early Proterozoic layer with iron carbonate and iron silicate.  The original 20–30 m thick Homestake Formation, has been deformed and metamorphosed, resulting in upper greenschist facies of siderite-phyllite, and lower amphibolite facies of grunerite schists.

The iron may have been deposited by volcanic exhalation, perhaps in the presence of microorganisms as a banded iron formation. Gold ore mineralization is most intense in the Main Ledge, at the surface, and the 9 Ledge, at the 3200 level (feet below the Incline Shaft, at 1594 m above sea level).

See also
Colorado Mineral Belt, regarding the Henderson Mine
Volcanogenic massive sulfide ore deposit (VMS), the base-metal rich equivalent to Homestake

References

Further reading

External links

Homestake mine visitors center website
Sanford Underground Laboratory at Homestake
Homestake DUSEL
Black Hills Geology photo album, mostly of the mine area, by geologist James St. John

Black Hills
Gold mines in the United States
Buildings and structures in Lawrence County, South Dakota
Surface mines in the United States
Underground mines in the United States
Former mines in the United States
Mines in South Dakota
Tourist attractions in Lawrence County, South Dakota
Stamp mills
2002 disestablishments in South Dakota